John Cotes (1749-1821) was MP for two constituencies.  He sat for Wigan from 1782 to 1802 as a Tory, and for Shropshire from 1806 until his death as a Whig.

His son also named John was an MP too.

Sources
Biography at the History of Parliament

1749 births
1821 deaths
British MPs 1780–1784
British MPs 1784–1790
British MPs 1790–1796
British MPs 1796–1800
Members of the Parliament of Great Britain for constituencies in Lancashire
Members of the Parliament of the United Kingdom for constituencies in Shropshire
Members of the Parliament of the United Kingdom for Wigan
Tory members of the Parliament of Great Britain
Tory MPs (pre-1834)
UK MPs 1801–1802
UK MPs 1806–1807
UK MPs 1807–1812
UK MPs 1812–1818
UK MPs 1818–1820
UK MPs 1820–1826
Whig (British political party) MPs for English constituencies